La Gabarra Massacre was a massacre that occurred on August 21, 1999 near the Colombian village of La Gabarra, Municipality of Tibú, Norte de Santander,  near the Colombia–Venezuela border.  It was perpetrated by members of the United Self-Defense Forces of Colombia (AUC paramilitary group) against alleged members of the Revolutionary Armed Forces of Colombia (FARC guerrilla). Some 35-43 people were massacred.

References

Conflicts in 1996
June 1996 crimes
June 1996 events in South America
Massacres in Colombia
Mass murder in 1996
Massacres in 1996
Deaths by firearm in Colombia
1996 in Colombia
Massacres committed by FARC